The following is a timeline of the history of the city of Lomé, Togo.

Prior to 20th century

 1874 - Lomé founded "by African, British and German traders."
 1897 - Lomé becomes capital of German colonial Togoland.

20th century

 1902 - Catholic Cathedral built.
 1904 - Wharf constructed.
 1905
 Aného-Lomé railway and Palace of the Governors built.
 1907
 Kpalimé-Lomé railway and Protestant church built.
 1911 - Atakpamé-Lomé railway built.
 1914 - Lomé "annexed by the British from the Gold Coast."
 1920 - Lomé becomes capital of colonial French Togoland.
 1920s - Boulevard Circulaire laid out.
 1922 - Political "council of notables" formed.
 1932
 Municipality established.
 Étoile Filante du Togo football club formed.
 1933 - January: "Riot by women" against taxes.
 1955
 Lonato building constructed.
 Catholic Metropolitan Archdiocese of Lomé established.
 1957 - La Vérité Togolaise newspaper begins publication.
 1958 - Tokoin becomes part of Lome.
 1960 - City becomes part of independent Togo.
 1961 - Dynamic Togolais football club formed.
 1962
 Togo-Presse government newspaper begins publication.
 Population: 80,000.
 1963 - 13 January: 1963 Togolese coup d'état; Sylvanus Olympio assassinated.
 1965 - Happy Star Concert Band formed.
 1968 - Stade Général Eyadema (stadium) opens.
 1969 - Deep-water harbor built.
 1970
 University of Benin founded.
 Population: 148,156.
 1975
 Togo National Museum opens.
 City hosts signing of the Lomé Convention.
 1980 - Hotel du 2 Fevrier and West African Development Bank built.
 1981 - Population: 375,499.
 1983 - British School established.
 1985
 Ecobank headquartered in city.
 Bombings.
 1989
 "Industrial and harbour free zone" established.
 Dove of Peace statue unveiled in Tokoin.
 1990 - 5 October: Anti-government demonstrations begin.
 1991 - April: Crackdown on anti-government demonstrators.
 1993 - La Dépêche newspaper begins publication.
 1997
 Nouvel Echo newspaper begins publication.
 Al-Furkan Center built.
 1998 - Bourse Régionale des Valeurs Mobilières (stock exchange) branch established.
 1999 - July: City hosts signing of the Lomé Peace Accord.
 2000 - Stade de Kégué (stadium) opens.

21st century
 2001 - October: Mayor Amousouvi Akakpo arrested.
 2005
 March: Funeral of Gnassingbé Eyadéma.
 May: Post-election unrest.
 2007 - Musée international du Golfe de Guinée (museum) founded.
 2011 - Population: 1,524,000 (urban agglomeration).
 2012
 June: Political demonstration.
 University of Science and Technology of Togo established.
 2013 - 11 January: Lomé Grand Market fire.
 2015 - Population: 1,788,600 (estimate, urban agglomeration).

See also
 History of Lomé (in French)
 History of Togo

References

This article incorporates information from the French Wikipedia.''

Bibliography

in English
 
 
  (about Cape Town, Johannesburg, Libreville, Lomé)

in French

in German

External links

  (Bibliography of open access  articles)
  (Images, etc.)
  (Images, etc.)
  (Bibliography)
  (Bibliography)
  (Bibliography)
 
 . Initiated by Agence universitaire de la Francophonie. (Includes information about Lomé)

Lomé
lome
lome
lome
Years in Togo
Lome